Monica Ong also known as Monica Ong Reed is an Asian-American visual poet. She studied at the Rhode Island School of Design. In 2015 she created Silent Anatomies which received the Kore Press First Book Award. In the early 2020s Ong created Planetaria, a series of visual poems exhibited at the Poetry Foundation.

Her work has been published in Scientific American and Hyperallergic. Her work is in the collection of the National Museum of Women in the Arts.

References

External links
 Official website

Living people
Year of birth missing (living people)
Women book artists
American women artists
American women poets
21st-century American women
Rhode Island School of Design alumni
Visual poets